Volitive modality (abbreviated ) is a linguistic modality that indicates the desires, wishes or fears of the speaker. It is classified as a subcategory of deontic modality.

Realisation in speech
Volitive moods are a category of grammatical moods that are used to express volitive modality. Examples are the optative, desiderative and imprecative moods.
However, many languages (like English) have other ways to express volitive modality, for example modal verbs ("Wish that you were here!", "May he live forever!").

Esperanto
The verb form is formally called volitive, but in practice, it can be seen as a broader deontic form, rather than a pure volitive form, since it is also used to express orders and commands besides wishes and desires.

Examples:
 ― "Come." (a request or command)
 ― "Give it to me." (a request or command)
 ― "Let's do that." (a desire or aim)
 ― "I ought to go to sleep." (expresses the desirability of the action)
 ― "May your child be successful in life." (a wish or desire)
 ― "I want you to help me." (a desire)
 ― "She asks that I be silent." (a request)

See also
 Volition (linguistics)

References

Grammatical moods
Linguistic modality
Semantics
Formal semantics (natural language)